The 1898 Nevada gubernatorial election was held on November 8, 1898.

Incumbent Silver Party Governor Reinhold Sadler defeated Republican nominee William McMillan, Democratic nominee George Russell, and Populist nominee J. B. McCullough with 35.67% of the vote.

General election

Candidates
J. B. McCullough, Populist, businessman
William McMillan, Republican, merchant, Republican candidate for U.S. Senate in 1897
George Russell, Democratic, merchant
Reinhold Sadler, Silver, incumbent Governor

Results

References

1898
Nevada
Gubernatorial